Men's Gymnasium may refer to:

Men's Gymnasium, University of Arizona, now Bear Down Gym
Men's Gymnasium-University of Arkansas, Fayetteville, now Faulkner Performing Arts Center
Men's Gymnasium (University of Chicago), Illinois
Men's Gymnasium (Indiana University)
Men's Gymnasium (University of North Texas), now Ken Bahnsen Gym
Men's Gymnasium Building (Baku)

See also
 Men's Gym (UCLA) or Student Activities Center, UCLA, California
 Men's Gym (Berkeley), now the Haas Pavilion
 Women's Gymnasium (disambiguation)